Mhaw Kyauk Sar, is a 2018 Burmese historical romantic drama film starring Myint Myat, Shwe Hmone Yati, Htun Htun, Thu Htoo San, Phyo Ngwe Soe and May Myint Mo. The film, produced by Myanmar Media 7 Film Production and premiered in Myanmar on October 5, 2018.

Cast
Myint Myat as Rakarway (Prince), Di Thaung
Shwe Hmone Yati as Par Di May, Josh
Htun Htun as Wutta Kyaw (Commander-in-Chief)
Thu Htoo San as Wasaysaya (King) 
Phyo Ngwe Soe as Thettaka (Wizard)
May Myint Mo as Hariman (Princess)
May Than Nu

References

2018 films
2010s Burmese-language films
Burmese romantic drama films
Films shot in Myanmar
2018 romantic drama films